Citizens Insurance, or Citizens, is the popular name for government established, not-for-profit insurers in Florida and Louisiana.  In Florida, the insurer is Citizens Property Insurance Corporation.  In Louisiana, the insurer is the Louisiana Citizens Property Insurance Corporation.  Both were established in their respective states as insurers of last resort.  The Louisiana corporation is also known as Louisiana Citizens

Neither of these is connected with for-profit insurers with similar names.

Florida 

Citizens Property Insurance Corporation was created in 2002 by the Florida state government to provide property insurance for home-owners who could not obtain insurance elsewhere. It is a government-owned, not for profit, insurer of last resort.

Louisiana 
From the website of the Louisiana Citizens Property Insurance Corporation: "The Louisiana Citizens Property Insurance Corporation is a nonprofit organization created to provide insurance products for residential and commercial property applicants who are in good faith entitled, but unable, to procure insurance through the voluntary insurance marketplace."  Citizens has the ability to levy assessments against all other Property and Casualty insurance policies should needed capital be otherwise unavailable.

References

External links
Citizens Property Insurance Corporation -- www.citizensfla.com
 Louisiana Citizens Property Insurance Corporation -- www.lacitizens.com
 Citizens Insurance -- citizensinsurance.net covering Insurance topics in Michigan, Louisiana, and Florida
Homeowners for Affordable Coverage -- Homeowners Against Citizens / Having Affordable Coverage =
Citizens Insurance Florida

Insurance companies of the United States